John Johnson (11 December 1921 – October 2003) was an English professional footballer who made over 290 appearances in the Football League for Millwall as an outside right. He is a member of the club's Hall of Fame.

Career statistics

Honours 

 Millwall Hall of Fame

References

1921 births
English footballers
English Football League players
People from Hazel Grove
Millwall F.C. players
Stockport County F.C. players
Southern Football League players
Tonbridge Angels F.C. players
Margate F.C. players
2003 deaths
Association football outside forwards
Canterbury City F.C. players
Dover Athletic F.C. players
Kent Football League (1894–1959) players